Tambun (Jawi: تمبون) is a major town in Kinta District, Perak, Malaysia. The Lost World of Tambun, a waterpark, is located here, as is the prehistoric Tambun rock art.

Famous goods

Pomelos 

Tambun is notable for its pomelo produce, which is sought after by locals and tourists alike. Many planters were Hakkas from southern China. The fruit was originally brought in from Southern China together with the travelling Chinese as a good source of Vitamin C on extended ship journeys. The plant adapted well to Tambun-Ampang-Piah region's dark and ferrous soil conditions.

Most pomelo farms harvest twice a year in conjunction with Chinese New Year and Mid Autumn Festival. However, some enterprising farmers have managed to have a third crop squeezed to increase their yield. In the early years of the 20th century and the emergency period after the Second World War, most Tambun planters also increased yield by rearing pigs and chickens within their pomelo farms. This practiced continued until the turn of the century when Japanese encephalitis struck the district.

Animal droppings
In Tambun, animal droppings are used as fertilisers. Within the district were Sikh cow farm which supplement their income by selling cow-dungs - a favoured source of fertilisers the pomelo orchards.

References

Kinta District
Towns in Perak